Loveland is a city in Hamilton, Clermont, and Warren counties in the southwestern part of the U.S. state of Ohio. The population was 13,307 at the 2020 census. It borders Symmes, Miami and Hamilton townships and straddles the Little Miami River. Once a busy railroad town, Loveland is now a major stop along the Little Miami Scenic Trail.

History
The city is named after James Loveland, who operated a general store and post office near the railroad tracks downtown. It was incorporated as a village on May 12 or 16, 1876, and incorporated as a chartered city in 1961.

Settlement
Present-day Loveland originally lay at the edges of the Symmes Purchase and Virginia Military District, in what was then the Northwest Territory. The area was first settled in 1795 by Col. Thomas Paxton:

Paxton named the settlement after himself in 1849, but it was renamed Loveland the following year.

Village getaway
In its early days, Loveland was known as a resort town, with its summer homes for the wealthy, earning it the nickname "Little Switzerland of the Miami Valley." Future Chief Justice Salmon P. Chase maintained a country home near Loveland, while the Cincinnati YWCA maintained a summer cottage there. The area was also home to Ohio's first paper mill, built in 1810 by John Smith. A local road retains the mill's eventual name, Kugler Mill. The area surrounding Loveland in Clermont County was well known for its peaches and strawberries. The Obionsville Post Office began operations on October 24, 1831, then changed its name to the Loveland Post Office on January 14, 1848.

The Hillsboro and Cincinnati Railroad was chartered in 1846 to run a line between Hillsboro and O'Bannon Creek in Loveland on the Little Miami Railroad's route. The H&C would lease its line in perpetuity to the Marietta and Cincinnati Railroad and ultimately became the mainline of the Baltimore and Ohio Railroad. Loveland's location at the junction of the Little Miami Railroad (now converted into the Loveland Bike Trail) and the Marietta and Cincinnati Railroad fueled the city's growth, bringing "40 passenger trains per day, and 12 scheduled freight trains between Loveland and Cincinnati."

Another railroad ran through antebellum Loveland: the Underground Railroad's Eastern Route from Cincinnati included a stop at the village and continued northward to Waynesville and Lebanon. During the Civil War, Confederate Brig. Gen. John Hunt Morgan and his troops passed through Loveland, seizing possessions of northern and southern sympathizers alike (see Morgan's Raid).

Until wagon bridges were built across the Little Miami River, settlement of Loveland was mostly confined to the Clermont County side, which had access to a railroad station. A wooden bridge spanned the river at Symmestown and Branch Hill from 1850 until it washed out six years later. For years, residents on both sides pushed for a bridge at Loveland, to avoid the long trip to Foster's Crossing or Miamiville, and by 1868 threatened to have Miami Township annexed to Hamilton County if Clermont County officials continued to obstruct the project. A $75,000 suspension bridge was finally built at Symmestown and Branch Hill and dedicated on July 4, 1871. It was anchored by four  wrought iron columns, at that time the heaviest ever made in the United States. A second bridge, connecting East and West Loveland, was completed between 1872 and 1876.

Loveland incorporated as a village on May 16, 1876. John H. Law was elected the village's first mayor. That year, the Cincinnati Campground at Loveland was the site of the holiness movement's tenth annual National Camp Meeting.

In 1886, the skeleton of a mastodon and prehistoric stone tools were found in a Loveland gravel pit.

In 1903, Loveland voted to become a dry village, prohibiting the sale of alcohol within the village limits 17 years before a national ban. Loveland was a center of the Temperance movement in Ohio.

Downtown Loveland's proximity to the Little Miami River has made it vulnerable to flooding. The worst such event, the Ohio Flood of March 1913, destroyed a corn mill and washed out the Loveland Bridge, which was replaced with an iron bridge the next year.

In the 1920s, The Cincinnati Enquirer ran a promotion that offered a free plot of land in Loveland, along the Little Miami River, after paying for a one-year subscription to the daily. The Loveland Castle was built on multiple plots obtained through this promotion.

Growing city

After a population spike during the 1950s, Loveland reincorporated as a chartered city – the first of only two in Clermont County – on July 25, 1961, with George Anderson as its first mayor. The city absorbed smaller settlements, such as Paxton, Obanionsville, and Symmestown. German architect Rudolf Fränkel developed a master plan for Loveland.

Another major flood in 1959 led to the construction of a dike along the Little Miami River in 1962–1963.

In 1969, Loveland elected Viola Phillips as mayor; she was the first woman to serve as a city official.

In 1972 and 1973, Loveland was the site of multiple Ku Klux Klan rallies that drew members from multiple states.

The long-abandoned Little Miami Railroad corridor was converted into a bike trail in the 1980s and became part of the Little Miami Scenic Trail in 1984.

Loveland has periodically sought to expand its borders by annexing surrounding areas, primarily to the more commercially active west. In 1993, the city attempted to annex parts of Deerfield Township, prompting petitions to instead merge the township with the City of Mason. Moves to merge Symmes Township with Loveland began the next year but ultimately failed. In 1996, Loveland moved its eastern border by purchasing Col. Paxton's original White Pillars homestead, which had remained unincorporated, despite being the first settlement in the Loveland area.

In the late 1990s, Loveland was designated a Tree City by the National Arbor Day Foundation, as it began a number of efforts to promote its Historic Downtown neighborhood, in part to celebrate the city's bicentennial. The programs included a renovation of Historic Downtown itself to sport a more "gentrified" look, for example replacing concrete sidewalks with brick ones, installing park benches throughout, and providing incentives to businesses willing to improve their façades. Major roads such as South Lebanon Road (County Road 298) were expanded and given landscaped medians.

The front lawn of Loveland City Hall was decorated with a nativity scene annually from 1973 until 1993, when a representative of the Ku Klux Klan asked the city for permission to erect a cross beside the display. Since then, the nativity scene has been placed on privately owned property.

The Loveland Beautification Committee was established to sponsor various programs and events that aim to improve landscapes and other buildings around town. Under the mayorship of Lee Skierkiewicz, Loveland heavily promoted itself as a cycling destination. The Tour de Loveland, an annual cycling race, was started in order to promote the Loveland Bike Trail as the centerpiece of Historic Downtown Loveland. The city's efforts culminated with USA Cycling Elite National Championship criteriums in June 1998. On January 24, 2005, Loveland City Council voted to cancel the Tour, due to declining attendance and a lack of sponsors.

On April 9, 1999, Loveland found itself in the path of an F4 tornado (see Fujita scale). The tornado claimed four fatalities, including a Loveland resident, before reaching the city.

With "four blooms", Loveland won the 2005 America in Bloom competition for cities with 10,001 to 15,000 residents. Loveland lost to St. Ives/Carbis Bay in the 2006 Communities in Bloom International Challenge, medium category, but won the "Communities in Bloom Youth Involvement Project Award."

In 2004, CSX Transportation leased the former Baltimore and Ohio railroad to RailAmerica's Indiana and Ohio Railway system. On May 4, 2007, Ohio's first four-quadrant gate was installed at the Second Street railroad crossing in Loveland, as part of a coordinated three-crossing system.

In 2013, Loveland was named a "Best Hometown" by Ohio Magazine.

Loveland went without a mayor from August to December 2017, after Mayor Mark Fitzgerald resigned under pressure from a recall effort and a move to replace him was declared invalid.

Zoning controversies
Loveland has seen several controversies over zoning regulation. After the city acquired the White Pillars property in 1996, it began plans to develop the land, which is situated on State Route 48. Prior to being elected councilman, Paul Elliot participated in a lawsuit against the city over attempting to rezone the property for commercial use without voter approval. In 2003, Mike Showler led a successful referendum to block the rezoning. An earlier attempt to develop a YMCA location on a section of Phillips Park also failed, when a group of residents protested the city's development plans, prompting the YMCA to abandon the location. In December 2006, Loveland announced a plan to build a Loveland Recreation Center on land adjacent to Phillips Park. The city planned to enter into an operating agreement with the YMCA once the center was built; however, the Recreation Center tax referendum was defeated in May 2007. The Recreation Center plan was later revised, but Loveland residents again rejected an income tax levy to fund the center on November 6, 2007.

Shooter's Supply, a local gun store, proposed building an indoor shooting range at the former location of the Matthew 25: Ministries humanitarian aid agency. Nearby residents attempted to block the shooting range, which would be built near several apartment complexes and residential neighborhoods, as well as a church. In May 2007, the building was instead converted into a luxury boarding facility for dogs.

Geography

Loveland can be reached by car most easily via Interstate 275, but State Route 48 also serves the city. State Route 3 / U.S. Route 22 touches the northwestern corner of Loveland, and State Route 126 passes through Remington and Miamiville to the south.

Loveland is located within three counties: Hamilton, Clermont and Warren. At least 61 Ohio cities cross county lines. Loveland has withdrawn from Symmes, Miami, and Hamilton Townships to form a coextensive set of paper townships each named Loveland Township. Historic Downtown Loveland and the central business district lie in a small valley on opposite sides of the Little Miami Scenic River, the boundary between Hamilton and Clermont counties, whereas most of Loveland's residential areas are located on the hills surrounding the valley on either side. Loveland City Hall is located in Clermont County, whereas most of the population resides in Hamilton County.

These areas include some neighborhoods from the 1950s and earlier, as well as a number of newer subdivisions built as part of the urban sprawl that saw nearby Mason grow tremendously. Unlike Mason and other suburbs closer to Interstate 71 and Interstate 75, Loveland is considered somewhat of a "bedroom community", where residential neighborhoods (and churches) seemingly outnumber businesses, and many residents make the half-hour commute to Downtown Cincinnati for work each day.

The 513 area code includes the entirety of Loveland. The 45140 ZIP code also includes the entire city, with the exception of a few recently annexed businesses that belong to the 45249 ZIP code (Symmes). The United States Postal Service lists a number of place names as unacceptable for this ZIP code, including "Murdock" and "Twenty Mile Stand"; however, "Loveland, Ohio" is acceptable for Camp Dennison's 45111 ZIP code. The 45108 FIPS55 code and US XHT LOCODE both correspond to the city proper.

Demographics

In 1880, when the first census was taken of Loveland in Clermont County, the village had 595 residents, while the unincorporated Hamilton County community of West Loveland had 197. In 1890, Loveland grew to 761 residents in Clermont and Warren counties, while West Loveland's population increased to 392.

2010 census
As of the census of 2010, there were 12,081 people, 4,701 households, and 3,270 families residing in the city. The racial makeup of the city was 93.5% White, 2.1% African American, 0.1% Native American, 1.7% Asian (of whom 36% were Asian Indian and 20% were Chinese), 0.1% Pacific Islander, 0.6% from other races, and 1.9% from two or more races. Hispanic or Latino of any race were 2.4% of the population, of whom 53% were of Mexican descent.

There were 4,701 households, of which 38.3% had children under the age of 18 living with them, 52.5% were married couples living together, 13.4% had a female householder with no husband present, 3.7% had a male householder with no wife present, and 30.4% were non-families. 26.3% of all households were made up of individuals, and 11.7% had someone living alone who was 65 years of age or older. The average household size was 2.55 and the average family size was 3.09.

The median age in the city was 38 years. 27.9% of residents were under the age of 18; 6.7% were between the ages of 18 and 24; 25.6% were from 25 to 44; 27.2% were from 45 to 64; and 12.8% were 65 years of age or older. The gender makeup of the city was 47.9% male and 52.1% female.

The median income for a household in the city was $68,801, and the median income for a family was $89,199. Males had median earnings of $70,262 versus $44,652 for females. The per capita income for the city was $32,024, while the unemployment rate was 5.4% for those age 16 or older.  About 8.0% of families and 8.4% of the population were below the poverty line, including 11.2% of those under age 18 and 10.4% of those age 65 or over. According to 2002 data from the Internal Revenue Service, Loveland residents gave 2.60% of their net income to charity.

Economy
Tourism associated with the Loveland Bike Trail forms a significant part of downtown Loveland's economy. There is light industry at the Loveland Commerce Park in the northwestern corner of the city. Companies headquartered in Loveland include Dos Madres Press and Rozzi Fireworks.

From 1986 to 1998, the Baldwin Piano & Organ Company was headquartered in Loveland. Martinizing Dry Cleaning, Totes Isotoner, Pro Mach, and Blue Chip Cookies were also formerly headquartered in Loveland.

Arts and culture

Although the city's unusual name came from the last name of the village storeowner and postmaster, rather than the concept, Loveland has incorporated a "love" theme throughout the city. Loveland water towers and park signs sport the city's logo: a red heart inscribed with a sun, clouds, and the Little Miami River, and surrounded with the city's nickname, "Sweetheart of Ohio." The Loveland Post Office was the site of the United States Postal Service's issuance of a 29¢ commemorative "Love Sunrise" stamp on January 27, 1994, the first self-adhesive Love stamp. Each year since 1972, the Loveland Area Chamber of Commerce has run a special Valentine's Day program, which includes a poetry contest and the selection of a volunteer "Valentine Lady". The Valentine Lady helps stamp up to 20,000 envelopes by hand with a Valentine-themed cachet and cancellation that reads "There is nothing in this world so sweet as Love." The first Valentine Lady was Doris Pfiester. Loveland has held a greeting card design contest annually since 1989. , Valentine's Day is the only day of the year when non-residents may reserve Loveland City Hall for marriage ceremonies, other than for senior citizens.

The Grail's national headquarters and retreat center, known as Grailville, has been located just outside Loveland since 1944.

The soul, funk, and retro-soul record label Colemine Records is based in Loveland and shares a building with its associated record store, Plaid Room Records.  Colemine was founded in 2007 and has released records by artists such as Durand Jones & The Indications, Black Pumas, Delvon Lamarr Organ Trio, and Ikebe Shakedown.

Parks and recreation

Biking along the Loveland Bike Trail and canoeing along the Little Miami River are popular activities during the summer. Loveland has a series of 16 city parks, including neighborhood "tot lots", Nisbet Park, a Veteran's Memorial, and Fireman's Memorial. The parks are maintained by the City of Loveland Recreation Commission. The Loveland Bike Trail is a popular segment of the Little Miami Scenic Trail, a state park that runs through the city. From spring to fall, people canoe down the Little Miami River, departing from the livery at Loveland Canoe & Kayak.

Shield's Crossing is located in Loveland. The Gothic-style building, also known as the William Johnston House, is listed on the National Register of Historic Places.

Chateau Laroche, a historical museum and folly also known as the Loveland Castle, is located just outside of the city in Loveland Park.

Loveland's indoor attractions include Castle Skateland, a roller skating rink not to be confused with the museum; and the Loveland Stage Company, a theatre group that started in 1979 and has performed at least two major productions each year since 1980. In October 2002, after several years of fundraising and renovations, the group moved into Crist Theater, an old movie theater donated by the Loveland–Symmes Fire Department, which is stationed next door. The building had to be rebuilt after a fire gutted it on October 20, 2008.

Government

Loveland uses a council–manager form of government. The Loveland City Council has seven at-large seats, elected to four-year terms in non-partisan elections held every two years. , they are held by Mayor Kathy Bailey, Vice-Mayor Rob Weisgerber, and councilmembers Neal Oury, Kent Blair, Ted Phelps, Angie Settell and Tim Butler. Dave Kennedy is City Manager. Traffic cases and other misdemeanors are heard in Loveland Mayor's Court, which is presided over by a magistrate.

At the federal level, Loveland is located within Ohio's 2nd congressional district. At the state level, it is also served by the 27th, 62nd, and 65th House districts; the 7th and 14th Senate districts; and the 1st and 12th appellate court districts. See Ohio House of Representatives and Ohio Senate for the current representatives of the respective state districts.

According to the Loveland Code of Ordinances, the city's corporate seal consists of "the coat of arms of the state engraved in the center and the words 'City of Loveland' engraved around the edge".

The city flag was adopted on August 27, 1974. It was designed by Howard A. Miller, a retired Air Force captain and vexillologist who lived in Loveland. Its diagonally divided field represents the three counties in which Loveland is located. A red heart in the center is a pun on the name of founder James Loveland; the city's year of settlement is inscribed on the heart. A buckeye leaf surmounts the heart, representing Ohio.

Education
The city's public school district, Loveland City School District, operated as separate Loveland East and Loveland West districts until 1926. Until 2009, Loveland High School was located in Symmes Township, just outside the city limits. The northern- and southernmost parts of Loveland are served by Sycamore Community School District. Surrounding communities lie within the boundaries of Kings Local School District (see Kings High School), Milford Exempted Village School District (Milford High School), and Little Miami Local School District (Little Miami High School). The city is also served by the Great Oaks Institute of Technology and Career Development and a regional vocational school district. There are many private schools located near Loveland, including Cincinnati Hills Christian Academy, Archbishop Moeller High School, and Ursuline Academy at the secondary level, and St. Margaret of York School, St. Columban School, and Children's Meeting House Montessori School at the elementary level. At the 2000 census, 24.6% of Loveland children attended private or parochial schools, the nineteenth-highest rate among Greater Cincinnati communities.

The Public Library of Cincinnati and Hamilton County maintains a branch library in downtown Loveland, as well as a larger regional branch library in Symmes Township. The nearest branch of the Clermont County Public Library is in Milford. Warren County has no county-wide public library system, but the Mason Public Library is the nearest public library in the county.

Media
Loveland lies within the Cincinnati media market. Some Dayton-area media is also available. Cable television is provided by Spectrum. Cincinnati Bell provides IPTV service under the FiOptics brand.

"Loveland Local News" covers Loveland business, political, sports, and education, foucing on Loveland and surrounding areas.

"Loveland Magazine" is an online newspaper.

"Eye on Loveland" produces and distributes a free podcast focused on the politics of the city.

The Cincinnati Enquirer once published The Loveland Herald, a weekly newspaper, but the newspaper ceased publication in early 2019. The Herald began as The Tri-County Press in 1901 and took its present name in 1917. The Herald editorial offices were located in Miami Township until 2015 and then located to the Enquirer headquarters in downtown Cincinnati.

Defunct newspapers include The Loveland Herald (1901-2019), The Loveland Weekly Herald (1877–?), The Loveland Enterprise (1884–?), The Hustler (1906–1911), The Loveland News World (1980s), and The Loveland Record.

Infrastructure

Law enforcement
Loveland is protected by the Loveland Police Division and the Loveland–Symmes Fire Department, a member of the Northeast Fire Collaborative. Dispatching for both is handled by Northeast Communications Center (NECC), which provides Wireless Enhanced 911 service and also activates the local network of tornado sirens.

Services
The city lies in the Little Miami telephone exchange, within Cincinnati Bell's ILEC coverage area. Loveland receives electric and natural gas services from Duke Energy Ohio, formerly Cincinnati Gas & Electric. Waste disposal and recycling services are provided by Rumpke through the Southwest Ohio Regional Refuse (SWORRE) consortium. Loveland has water interconnectivity agreements with the City of Cincinnati and Clermont County. Loveland's Polk Run Wastewater Treatment Plant is part of Hamilton County's Greater Cincinnati Metropolitan Sewer District (MSD) under a 1985 operating agreement. The city sought to end the agreement in 2008, due to district-wide rate increases, but was barred from leaving MSD by a court ruling affirmed by the U.S. 6th Circuit Appeals Court.

Notable people

Arts and entertainment
 Wilbur G. Adam painter and illustrator
 Wendy Barrie-Wilson Broadway actress
 Nancy Ford Cones photographer, featured on Woman's Home Companion and Country Life in America
 Ann Donahue television writer
 Vanessa German sculptor, painter, writer, activist, performer, and poet
 Emma Montgomery McRae professor of English literature
 Lillian Morris Survivor: Pearl Islands contestant
Ashley Palmer actress and singer
 William Schickel spiritual artist and architect who redesigned the Abbey of Our Lady of Gethsemani
 Jerry Springer former Mayor of Cincinnati, television host
 Madison Young porn star

Athletics
 Todd Benzinger former Major League Baseball first baseman and outfielder
 Don Biggs Canadian retired professional ice hockey player
 Tyler Biggs ice hockey player, Orlando Solar Bears
 Steve Brown darts player
 Adam Engel professional baseball outfielder, Chicago White Sox
 Matt Hamill mixed martial arts fighter and three-time NCAA Wrestling Division III national champion
 Joe Kelly professional football linebacker
Dan Ketchum gold medalist in swimming at the 2004 Summer Olympics
 Tacks Latimer professional baseball catcher and convicted murderer
 Henry W. Lever head football coach, Texas Christian University
 Bob Lohr professional golfer
 Jack Pfiester professional baseball player
 Mike Sylvester professional basketball player, silver medalist for Italy in 1980 Summer Olympics

Business
 Cecil Bauer former Mayor of Loveland, owner of Bauer Insurance
 Joshua I. Smith founder of Maxima Corporation; chair of the United States Commission on Minority Business Development

Military
 James Hall Army captain, editor of Western Monthly Magazine, lawyer, and jurist

Politics and law
 Gary Abernathy newspaper editor, Republican Party official, and political commentator
 Salmon P. Chase Chief Justice of the United States
 William Johnston Surveyor General of the Northwest Territory, superior court judge, and Whig gubernatorial nominee
 Lindiwe Mabuza formerly South African ambassador to Germany and High Commissioner to the UK
 Anna McGarry social activist on interracial justice and community organizer
 Bill Schickel Iowa State Representative
 Joe Uecker Republican member of the Ohio House of Representatives, 66th District

See also
 Loveland frog
 Loveland Park, Ohio

References

Further reading

External links

 
 Lovin Life official tourism website
 Greater Loveland Historical Society Museum

 
Cities in Ohio
Cities in Clermont County, Ohio
Cities in Hamilton County, Ohio
Cities in Warren County, Ohio
Articles which contain graphical timelines
1876 establishments in Ohio
Populated places established in 1876